Comicopera is the final album by Robert Wyatt, released on 8 October 2007 and available on both CD and double vinyl formats. The vinyl's fourth side contains no music and has a poem etched into its surface. It is Wyatt's first release on the Domino Records label. It features many other musicians, including Brian Eno, Paul Weller, Gilad Atzmon and Phil Manzanera, and was recorded in Wyatt's house and Manzanera's recording studio. The song "Del Mondo" is a cover from Ko de mondo, the second album of Italian post-punk band Consorzio Suonatori Indipendenti.

The Wire named Comicopera the record of the year in its annual critics' poll.

Track listing 

Act One: Lost in Noise
"Stay Tuned" (Anja Garbarek) – 3:49
"Just as You Are" (Alfreda Benge, Wyatt) – 4:21
"You You" (Alfreda Benge, Wyatt) – 4:22
"A.W.O.L." (Alfreda Benge, Wyatt) – 2:56
"Anachronist" (Wyatt) – 3:28
Act Two: The Here and the Now
"A Beautiful Peace" (Wyatt, Brian Eno) – 2:27
"Be Serious" (Wyatt) – 2:56
"On the Town Square" (Wyatt) – 5:26
"Mob Rule" (Wyatt) – 2:16
"A Beautiful War" (Wyatt, Brian Eno) – 2:40
"Out of the Blue" (Alfreda Benge, Wyatt) – 3:41
Act Three: Away With the Fairies
"Del Mondo" (Giovanni Lindo Ferretti, Massimo Zamboni, Gianni Maroccolo, Francesco Magnelli, Giorgio Canali) – 3:29
"Cancion de Julieta" (Federico García Lorca, Wyatt) – 7:32
"Pastafari" (Orphy Robinson) – 4:37
"Fragment" (Alfreda Benge, Wyatt) – 1:38
"Hasta Siempre Comandante" (Carlos Puebla) – 4:37

Personnel 

Robert Wyatt – voice, piano, percussion, keyboards, trumpet, cornet, pocket trumpet, guitar, old metronome, karenotron (voice of Karen Mantler), enotron (voice of Brian Eno), monicatron (voice of Monica Vasconcelos)
Brian Eno – keyboards, effects
Seaming To – voice, clarinet
Annie Whitehead – trombone, baritone horn
Yaron Stavi – bass violin
Monica Vasconcelos – voice
Paul Weller – guitar
Gilad Atzmon – saxophones, tenor saxophone, clarinet
Jamie Johnson – bass guitar
Dave Sinclair – piano
Phil Manzanera – guitar
Del Bartle – guitar
Orphy Robinson – steelpan, vibraphone
Chucho Merchan – bass violin
Maurizio Camardi – saxophones
Alfonso Santimone – piano, keyboards
Alessandro Fedrigo – bass guitar
Paolo Vidaich – percussion
Gianni Bertoncini – drums

References

External links 
Robert Wyatt Conducts Comicopera With Eno, Weller Pitchfork
Robert Wyatt, "Comicopera" Brainwashed
Robert Wyatt on Domino Records info

Robert Wyatt albums
2007 albums
Domino Recording Company albums
Albums produced by Robert Wyatt